Nima market is a major commercial market in Nima in the Greater Accra Region of Ghana.

References

Retail markets in Ghana